Ambra Angiolini (born 22 April 1977, in Rome) is an Italian actress and singer.

She made her film debut in Ferzan Özpetek's Saturn in Opposition (2007) for which she won the David di Donatello for Best Supporting Actress as well as the Nastro d'Argento for Best Supporting Actress, the Ciak d'oro and the Globo d'oro. She continued working as an actress in films like Black and White (2008), The Immature (2011), Viva l'Italia (2013), Do You Remember Me? (2014) and The Choice (2015).

On 9 October 1997, she was in Dario Fo's car recording an interview with him when a car drew up alongside, with an enormous placard in the window exclaiming "Dario, you've won the Nobel prize!", meaning Fo's initial reaction was captured on film.

Television beginnings and music career
In 1992, at the age of 15, she took part in the second edition of Non è la RAI. She left the show in 1995 to host Generazione X in Italia 1. She also hosted the shows Super, Non dimenticate lo spazzolino da denti and Cominciamo bene estate during the subsequent years, as well as Stasera niente MTC in MTV Italy.

Her first album  was released in 1994 and it was an instant success. The following year she recorded a Spanish version, Te pertenezco, which was a moderated hit reaching No. 21 on the Hot Latin Songs chart of Billboard. In February 1997 she was invited to take part in the Viña del Mar International Song Festival in Chile, where she aspicy and controversial performance with it is iconic today in the festival's history.

Her follow-up album,  (Angelitos in the Spanish-speaking markets), was released in 1996. Her third album  was released in 1997 in Italy and a Spanish version entitled Ritmos vitales followed in 1998. Her last album  was released in 1999 only in Italy.

Acting career

Angiolini won the Nastro d'Argento, the David di Donatello for Best Supporting Actress and the Ciak d'oro alla rivelazione dell'anno for her role in Saturno contro (2007) directed by Ferzan Özpetek.

Personal life
Angiolini was born in Rome to Doriana and Alfredo. She lived in Brescia with the singer-songwriter Francesco Renga and they had two children, Jolanda (born in 2004) and Leonardo (born in 2006). The couple separated in 2015, and since 2017 she has been in a relationship with the football manager Massimiliano Allegri.

Discography

Studio albums

Singles

As lead artist

As featured artist

Guest appearances

Filmography

Films

Television

References

External links
 
 

1977 births
Living people
Actresses from Rome
David di Donatello winners
Italian film actresses
Italian pop singers
Nastro d'Argento winners
Spanish-language singers of Italy
20th-century Italian actresses
21st-century Italian actresses
Singers from Rome
20th-century Italian women singers
21st-century Italian women singers
Italian women television presenters
Mass media people from Rome